San Estévan del Rey Mission Church is a Spanish mission church on the Acoma Pueblo Reservation in western New Mexico.  Built between 1629 and 1641, it is one of the finest extant examples of hybrid Spanish Colonial and Puebloan architectural styles.  It was named for Saint Stephen I of Hungary.  The church was declared a National Historic Landmark in 1970, and is listed on the National Register of Historic Places.

Description
The San Estévan del Rey Mission Church stands at the northern end of the large plaza that takes up the southern end of the mesa top that houses Sky City, the traditional Acoma pueblo settlement that has been continuously occupied since prehistoric times. It is a large adobe structure, built in a wall and beam construction style. The roof masonry, about six inches of adobe weighing several tons, is supported by large ponderosa pine vigas over which roughly-hewn wooden planks are laid. The interior is finished in gypsum, with an original native painting on the back wall of the sanctuary. Adjacent to the church is a small single-story convento, which served as the domicile for the priest. The mission also had other buildings, but these are in ruins. Adjacent to the church is a cemetery surrounded by a low wall with openings facing west, providing an opportunity for ancestors to return to find rest. The maintenance of the church traditionally falls to the Gaugashti, Acoma men designated “the church caretakers”, along with Pueblo of Acoma Historic Preservation Office.

History
Spanish colonial explorers first discovered Acoma in 1540. Spanish colonial authorities took authority over Acoma by force of arms in the 1599 Acoma massacre, making it part of the province of Santa Fe de Nuevo México. In 1629 Father Juan Ramírez began construction of the mission, using enslaved Acoma and craftsmen. During the 1680 Pueblo Revolt, the Acoma killed the local priest, but the church survived the uprising, and the Spanish return to power in 1692. The church has undergone relatively minor repairs, in 1799–1800, 1903, and 1924.

See also

 Spanish missions in New Mexico
 National Register of Historic Places listings in Cibola County, New Mexico
 List of National Historic Landmarks in New Mexico

References

External links

 Newmexico.org: Tourism information about the mission church
 Cstones.org: Restoration information
 

Spanish missions in New Mexico
Roman Catholic churches completed in 1641
National Historic Landmarks in New Mexico
Buildings and structures in Cibola County, New Mexico
Churches on the National Register of Historic Places in New Mexico
Tourist attractions in Cibola County, New Mexico
National Register of Historic Places in Cibola County, New Mexico
Adobe churches in New Mexico
17th-century Roman Catholic church buildings